Yeh Dillagi is a 1994 Indian Hindi-language romantic comedy-drama film directed by Naresh Malhotra and produced by Yash Chopra for his production company Yash Raj Films. Based on the 1954 American film Sabrina, its story revolves on two brothers (Akshay Kumar and Saif Ali Khan) who fall in love with their family driver's daughter, Sapna (Kajol), a successful model.

Yeh Dillagi released on 6 May 1994, and emerged as a commercial success, grossing 10.8 crore against its 1.6 crore budget. It received positive reviews from critics upon release, with particular praise directed towards Kajol's performance, thus proving to be a breakthrough for her. 

At the 40th Filmfare Awards, Yeh Dillagi received 4 nominations – Best Actor (Kumar), Best Actress (Kajol), Best Music Director (Dilip Sen, Sameer Sen) and Best Male Playback Singer (Abhijeet for the song "Ole Ole"). The film was later remade in Telugu as Priya O Priya.

Plot 
Vijay and Vicky are heirs to Saigal Industries, headed by their dad Bhanupratap Saigal. Vijay works all time. Vicky is smitten by Sapna, a model and the daughter of their driver Dharampal. Their mom Shanti rejects Sapna. Vijay tries to help Vicky but instead falls in love with Sapna who also develops feelings for Vijay.

The boys talk: both want Sapna. Vicky thinks Vijay supports his pursuit (Sapna). Shanti later asks Dharampal to take Sapna to Bombay or get fired. He storms off with her to the station but as Vicky attempts suicide if Shanti doesn't allow him to marry Sapna, Shanti finally accepts her. Sapna returns. Vicky instead sacrifices his love, uniting her and Vijay, as he has realized the truth. Then, he comes across and instantly falls for a girl, Anjali.

Cast

 Akshay Kumar as Vijayendra Saigal "Vijay"
 Saif Ali Khan as Vikram Saigal "Vicky"
 Kajol as Sapna
 Reema Lagoo as Shanti Saigal
 Saeed Jaffrey as Bhanupratap Saigal
 Deven Verma as Gurdas
 Achyut Potdar as Dharampal
 Neena Softa as Sujata
 Karishma Kapoor as Anjali Kashyap (Special Appearance)

Music
The film's soundtrack album contains seven songs composed by Dilip Sen-Sameer Sen. The song "Ole Ole", sung by Abhijeet was a hit at the music charts. The other artists who contributed to this album are Lata Mangeshkar, Kumar Sanu, Pankaj Udhas and Udit Narayan.

It became one of the top three best-selling Bollywood soundtrack albums of 1994, with 4.5million sales. The song 'Ole Ole' was remixed for Jawaani Jaaneman (2020).

Release and reception
According to the film-trade website Box Office India, the film opened to a wide audience and emerged as a commercial success and one of the highest-grossing films of 1994. Distributed by Eros International, it was released on DVD on 8 October 2007 in a single-disc pack. It was available for streaming on Amazon Prime Video and Apple TV+ since 23 May 2017.

Yeh Dillagi received a positive reception from critics. On 3 June 1994, The Indian Express praised Kajol's performance, saying that "[she] looks better than she did in Baazigar (1993) and gives a believable performance". A review published by India Today on 15 June hailed: "After a season of psychopaths and avenging angels, finally, relief. Here is romance, comedy and the foot-thumping ole ole." 

At the 40th Filmfare Awards, Yeh Dillagi received 4 nominations – Best Actor (Kumar), Best Actress (Kajol), Best Music Director (Dilip Sen, Sameer Sen) and Best Male Playback Singer (Abhijeet for the song "Ole Ole").

References

External links

1994 films
1990s Hindi-language films
Yash Raj Films films
Films scored by Dilip Sen-Sameer Sen
1994 romantic drama films
Hindi films remade in other languages
Indian remakes of American films
Indian romantic drama films